Acacia thomsonii, commonly known as Thomson's wattle, is a shrub or tree belonging to the genus Acacia and the subgenus Juliflorae that native to parts of northern Australia.

Description
The green to grey-green phyllodes are patent to ascending. The phyllodes are multistriate and normally have three nerves that are more obvious than the rest. It blooms from June to August producing yellow flowers. The seed pods that form after flowering are linear and straight to shallowly curved.

Taxonomy
The species was first formally described by the botanists Bruce Maslin and William McDonald in 1996 as part of the work Acacia thomsonii (Leguminosae: Mimosoideae: Acacia section Juliflorae) a new species from the tropical dry zone of Australia as published in the journal Nuytsia. It was reclassified as Racosperma thomsonii in 2003 by Leslie Pedley and transferred back to genus Acacia'' in 2006.

Distribution
In Western Australia it is found only in the Kimberley region. It is also found through the top end of the Northern Territory and parts of Western Queensland.
The plants are often situated on dissected plateaux and rocky low hills, stony or sandy plains and along diffuse drainage lines mostly growing in skeletal and slightly acidic rocky sandy soils.

See also
 List of Acacia species

References

thomsonii
Acacias of Western Australia
Flora of the Northern Territory
Plants described in 1996
Flora of Queensland
Taxa named by Bruce Maslin